Melbourne Vixens is an Australian netball team based in Melbourne, Victoria. Since 2017 they have represented Netball Victoria in Suncorp Super Netball. Between 2008 and 2016, they played in the ANZ Championship. The team was formed in 2007 when Netball Victoria merged its two former Commonwealth Bank Trophy league teams, Melbourne Phoenix and Melbourne Kestrels. Vixens have won three premierships, in 2009, 2014 and 2020.

History

ANZ Championship 
Between 2008 and 2016, Vixens played in the ANZ Championship. Vixens were formed in late 2007 when Netball Victoria merged its two former Commonwealth Bank Trophy league teams, Melbourne Phoenix and Melbourne Kestrels, in order to enter a single team in the 2008 ANZ Championship. During the ANZ Championship era, Vixens  won two premierships, in 2009 and 2014. In 2009, with a team co-captained by Bianca Chatfield and Sharelle McMahon, Vixens won 12 of their 13 matches during the regular season and finished as minor premiers. Vixens subsequently defeated Waikato Bay of Plenty Magic 58–43 in the major semi-final and Adelaide Thunderbirds 54–46 in the grand final to finish as overall champions.

In 2012, with a team captained by Bianca Chatfield,  and featuring Madison Browne, Julie Corletto and Geva Mentor, Vixens finished the season as minor premiers. In the major semi-final they defeated Northern Mystics 56–50. This was the first ever netball match held at Rod Laver Arena. However they lost the grand final 41–38 to Magic and finished the season as runners-up.

In 2014, with a team coached by Simone McKinnis, captained by Bianca Chatfield and also featuring Tegan Caldwell, Geva Mentor, Madison Robinson and the veteran Catherine Cox, Vixens won both the minor premiership and the overall championship.  Vixens defeated Queensland Firebirds in both the major semi-final and the grand final as they won their second premiership.

Regular season statistics

Suncorp Super Netball 
Since 2017, Vixens have represented Netball Victoria in Suncorp Super Netball. With a team coached by Simone McKinnis and captained by Kate Moloney, Vixens finished the inaugural season as minor premiers. However they subsequently lost both the major semi-final and preliminary final during the Finals Series and finished third overall. Four Vixens players – Mwai Kumwenda, Tegan Philip, Liz Watson and Jo Weston were named in the 2017 Team of the Year.

In 2020, with a team coached again by Simone McKinnis and co-captained by Kate Moloney and Liz Watson, Vixens finished the season as both minor premiers and overall champions. In the Grand Final they defeated West Coast Fever 66–64.

Following its championship win in 2020, the Vixens struggled in 2021, finishing last and claiming the wooden spoon for the first time in club history.

Vixens dominated the 2022 regular season before a shock defeat in the major semi-final by the West Coast Fever forced them to reach the Grand Final by winning the preliminary final, winning against GIANTS Netball 55-54. The club was unable to beat the Fever in the Grand Final, losing 70-59 and walking away runners-up.

Regular season statistics

Grand finals
ANZ Championship

Suncorp Super Netball

Home venues
Vixens main home venue has been John Cain Arena. Between 2008 and 2011 they also played some home games at the State Netball Hockey Centre. Since 2015, Margaret Court Arena has replaced the SNHC as Vixens secondary venue.

Notes
  Previously known as  Vodafone Arena, Hisense Arena and Melbourne Arena

Notable players

2023 squad

Internationals

 Karyn Bailey
 Johannah Curran
 Carla Dziwoki
 Amy Steel

 Ama Agbeze
 Geva Mentor
 Abby Sargent

 Kadie-Ann Dehaney

 Mwai Kumwenda

 Ine-Marí Venter

Captains

Award winners

Australian Netball Awards
Liz Ellis Diamond

Australian ANZ Championship Player of the Year

Suncorp Super Netball
SSN Grand Final MVP

SSN Team of the Year

ANZ Championship
ANZ Championship MVP

Notes
  In 2016 Madison Robinson was the MVP player in the Australian Conference and Jhaniele Fowler was the MVP player in the New Zealand Conference.

ANZ Championship Grand Final MVP

ANZ Championship All Stars

Vixens awards
Sharelle McMahon Medal
Since 2014, the Vixens' most valuable player of season award has been known as the Sharelle McMahon Medal, named after Sharelle McMahon.

Coaches' Award

Player of the Finals

Rookie of the Year

Excellence in Sport and Life Award

Head coaches

Team song
You want the best, Here we are, We'll give it all right now.
We're here to win, Come with us
We're gonna show you how

Stand up, Be proud, Shout it out loud

We are the Vixens, No one stands in our way, Power together
Stronger in every way, As one

We wear it true, Navy blue, That's what we're all about
Victoria, Feel the pride. And let the fox come out

Power, Power together, Power as one, Power, Power together
Vixens!

One team, One dream, Shout it out loud

We are the Vixens, No one stands in our way, Power together
Stronger in every way, As one

Victorian Fury

Victorian Fury are the reserve team of Melbourne Vixens. They play in the Australian Netball League. Fury are the most successful team in the ANL, winning their eighth premiership in 2019.

Premierships

Suncorp Super Netball
Winners: 2020
Minor Premierships: 2017, 2020, 2022
ANZ Championship
Winners: 2009, 2014
Runners Up: 2012
Minor Premierships: 2009, 2012, 2014

References

 
 
Netball teams in Australia
ANZ Championship teams
Suncorp Super Netball teams
Sports clubs established in 2007
2007 establishments in Australia
Sport in the City of Melbourne (LGA)